Colga  is a genus of sea slugs, specifically nudibranchs, shell-less marine gastropod molluscs in the family Polyceridae.

Species
Species in the genus Colga  include:
 Colga minichevi Martynov & Baranets, 2002
 Colga pacifica (Bergh, 1894)
 Colga ramosa (Verrill & Emerton, 1881)
 Colga villosa (Odhner, 1907)

References

Polyceridae
Gastropod genera